Tom Staniforth (born 13 August 1994) is an Australian rugby union player who currently "plays" as a lock for the  in the international Super Rugby competition.

Career

Staniforth was involved in the Brumbies pre-season plans ahead of the 2014 Super Rugby season, however he was unable to win a contract with either then senior squad or the wider training group.   As a result, he was forced to take up part-time work as a glass-collector to supplement his rugby earnings.

As a result, Staniforth was handed a two-week contract to provide injury cover. Surprisingly he found himself named in the starting line-up for the match at Suncorp Stadium which his side won 23–20. He played the first 65 minutes of the game and put in a credible performance against two experienced Wallabies in the shape of James Horwill and Rob Simmons. Indeed, Horwill was quoted after the game as saying: "He's a guy I imagine will have a big future. It's always good to see a young guy come through."

The Brumbies moved swiftly to tie Staniforth down to a longer-term deal, with the player signing a contract in May 2014 to tie him to the Brumbies until 2016.

International career

Staniforth was part of the Australia Under 20 side which competed in the 2013 IRB Junior World Championship in France. He was once again included the following year, also being named one of the vice-captains.
He Scored a try against ireland.

Super Rugby statistics

References

External links
 

1994 births
Australian rugby union players
People educated at Strathallan School
ACT Brumbies players
Canberra Vikings players
New South Wales Country Eagles players
People educated at Canberra Grammar School
Rugby union locks
Living people
New South Wales Waratahs players
Castres Olympique players
Rugby union players from Canberra